Sri Gundan Anivaritachari was the chief architect of the Virupaksha temple, the most famous and centerpiece at world heritage temple complex at Pattadakal. According to inscriptions he held such titles as "Anikapuravastu Pitamaha" and "Tenkanadesiya Sutradhari".

The temple was built at the orders of Lokamahadevi, the senior queen of Vikramaditya II to commemorate his victory over the Pallavas. It has many features similar to the Kailasanatha temple of Kanchi.

References

External links
History of Karnataka, Mr. Arthikaje

Artists from Karnataka
People of the Vijayanagara Empire
Indian male sculptors
Year of birth unknown
Year of death unknown
7th-century Indian sculptors
7th-century Indian architects
8th-century Indian sculptors
8th-century Indian architects